Sampson Ahi is a Ghanaian politician and member of the Seventh Parliament of the Fourth Republic of Ghana representing the Bodi constituency in the Western region on the ticket of the National Democratic Congress.

Early life and education
Ahi was born on 14 September 1976. He hails from Sefwi Bodi a town in the Western Region of Ghana. He received his Bachelor of Arts degree from the University of Ghana, Legon and his Executive Masters in Governance and Leadership (EMGL) from the Ghana Institute of Management and Public Administration (GIMPA).

Career
Prior to entering parliament, Ahi worked as a sector manager for Armar Jaro from 2003 to 2004. He was the Deputy Minister of Works and Housing under the Mahama administration.

Politics
Ahi entered parliament on 7 January 2005 representing the Juabeso constituency on the ticket of the National Democratic Congress. He represented the constituency until 2012 when he stood for the seat of the then newly created Bodi constituency. He has been the member of parliament of the constituency to date.

Personal life
Ahi is married with five children. He identifies as a Christian.

References

Ghanaian MPs 2017–2021
1976 births
Living people
National Democratic Congress (Ghana) politicians
Ghanaian MPs 2021–2025
Ghanaian Anglicans
Ghanaian Christians